Janet de Coux (or De Coux) (October 5, 1904 – 2000) was an American sculptor born in Niles, Michigan to Bertha Wright de Coux and the Reverend Charles John de Coux.  She is best remembered for her ecclesiastical reliefs and statues.

Early years
When she was eight years old her family moved to Gibsonia, Pennsylvania, near Pittsburgh.  While still in high school De Coux began attending the Carnegie Institute of Technology where she studied with Joseph Bailey Ellis.  Deciding that the program there was not geared enough to the fine arts she moved to The Louis Comfort Tiffany Foundation and then she attended the school of the Art Institute of Chicago. Whitney Warren wrote her a letter of introduction to C. Paul Jennewein, for whom she worked as an assistant.  This was followed by stints working for Aristide Cianfarani in Providence, where she attended the Rhode Island School of Design, and with Alvin Meyer in Chicago.  Later she served as an assistant to James Earle Fraser after she had helped enlarge his equestrian statue of Theodore Roosevelt.

During the Great Depression US President Franklin Deleno Roosevelt initiated the New Deal.  One of its programs was the Federal Art Projects under which the federal government hired artists, mostly painters and sculptors to create art for a variety of public places, often post offices. De Coux carved a relief, "Vacation Time" for the post office in Girard, Pennsylvania. In 1984 the piece was listed as “in storage.”

Later career
German critic Anton Henze selected de Coux’s “St. Benedict” as one of the United States’ notable, recent (1956) contributions to Roman Catholic art in his work ‘’Contemporary Church Art.

Work
Her work can be found at the following locations:
 Brookgreen Gardens, Murrells Inlet, South Carolina
 National Academy of Design, New York, New York
 Smithsonian American Art Museum, Washington, District of Columbia
 National Gallery of Art, Washington, District of Columbia
 University of Notre Dame, Snite Museum of Art, Notre Dame, Indiana
 Harvard University, Harvard Art Museum, Fogg Museum, Cambridge, Massachusetts
 State Museum of Pennsylvania, Memorial Hall  , Harrisburg, Pennsylvania 
 St. Stephen's Episcopal Church, Sewickley, Pennsylvania
 Sacred Heart Elementary School, Pittsburgh, Pennsylvania
 Society of Medalists
 St.Scholastica's Church, Aspinwall, Pennsylvania

References

1904 births
2000 deaths
20th-century American sculptors
American women sculptors
20th-century American women artists
People from Niles, Michigan
Sculptors from Michigan
People from Allegheny County, Pennsylvania
Sculptors from Pennsylvania
Carnegie Mellon University alumni
School of the Art Institute of Chicago alumni
Rhode Island School of Design alumni